Jaghbub is a remote desert village in the Al Jaghbub Oasis in the eastern Libyan Desert. It is actually closer to the Egyptian town of Siwa than to any Libyan town of note. The oasis is located in Butnan District and was the administrative seat of the Jaghbub Basic People's Congress. Supported by reservoirs of underground water and date production, the town is best known for its hard-won self-sufficiency. Idris of Libya was born in Jaghbub on 12 March 1890.

Geography
The Jaghbub oasis is located in a deep depression that extends below sea level. This depression, an area lower than the surrounding region, reaches to about -10 m. To the east the Siwa Oasis lies in a similar depression and even further east the large Qattara Depression also lies below sea level.

History  
It was once the headquarters of the Senussi Movement and home of a long disappeared Islamic university and the former Senussi palace (which is now in rubble). Jaghbub was a part of Egypt until December 1925, when it was ceded to Italy as part of a deal to fix the Egypt–Libya border. In February 1931, the Italian colonial administration led by Marshal Rodolfo Graziani decided to build a barbed-wire fence stretching from the Mediterranean port of Bardia to Jaghbub 270 km away. Supervised by armoured patrols and the air force, the fence sought to cut off the rebels from their supply sources and contacts with the Senussi leadership in Egypt. The construction of the fence began in April, 1931 and was completed in September. This, along with the deportation of almost the entire population of the Jebel Akhdar, was decisive and precipitated the end of the rebellion. The fence still runs along the Libyan-Egyptian border from near Tobruk, finishing at Jaghbub where the Great Sand Sea begins.

The construction of the fence was dramatized in the film Lion of the Desert.

The Siege of Giarabub was fought between Commonwealth and Italian forces during World War II. Italian and Libyan colonial troops led by Colonel Salvatore Castagna resisted a siege by mostly Australian troops for three months before being forced to surrender on 23 March 1941. The resistance of the Italian troops was celebrated by the fascist regime and used to minimize the military defeat in Cyrenaica.

See also
 List of World War II North Africa Airfields

Notes

J
J
Protected areas of Libya
Baladiyat of Libya